The 1997–98 South Pacific cyclone season was the most active South Pacific tropical cyclone season on record, with 16 tropical cyclones occurring within the South Pacific basin between 160°E and 120°W. The season started earlier than normal with 3 systems developing before the official start of the season on November 1, 1997, while the final system of the season dissipated on May 3, 1998, after the season had officially ended on April 30. During the season 50 people died as a result of tropical cyclones, with the deadliest being Cyclone Martin with 27 known deaths. After the season ended, 11 names had their names either removed or retired from the lists of names, after they caused significant impacts to South Pacific islands.

During the season, tropical cyclones were officially monitored by the Fiji Meteorological Service (FMS), New Zealand Met Service and the Australian Bureau of Meteorology. The United States Armed Forces through the Joint Typhoon Warning Center (JTWC) and Naval Pacific Meteorology and Oceanography Center (NPMOC), also monitored the basin and issued warnings for American interests. During the season the FMS issued warnings and assigned names to any tropical cyclones that developed between the Equator and 25°S while MetService issued warnings for any that were located to the south of 25°S. The JTWC issued warnings for American interests on any significant tropical cyclone that was located between 160°E and the 180° while the NPMOC issued warnings for tropical cyclones forming between 180° and the American coast. The FMS and MetService estimated sustained wind speeds over a 10-minute and used the Australian tropical cyclone intensity scale, while the JTWC and the NPMOC estimated sustained wind speeds over a 1-minute period which are compared to the Saffir-Simpson Hurricane Scale (SSHS).


Seasonal outlooks 

Ahead of the season officially starting on November 1, the Governor of American Samoa reported that traditionalists were forecasting a hurricane to affect American Samoa, during the season after the big breadfruit and mango harvest that the island nation had experienced. The Cook Islands Meteorological Service and National Disasters Committee warned islanders that they could expect the "worst cyclone season in years." On November 27, New Zealand's National Institute of Water and Atmospheric Research, issued a press release, which predicted that because of the strong El Niño phenomenon, there would be more tropical cyclones than average. In particular they predicted that due to the strong El Niño, countries within the western part of the basin were likely to see fewer tropical cyclones during the season than countries within the eastern part of the basin.

The Southern Cook Islands, Tonga, Tuvalu and French Polynesia, were predicted to have an increased risk, while Fiji was forecast to have an average risk of being affected by a tropical cyclone. NIWA also reported that Cyclone Martin's impact on the Northern Cook Islands was an early sign of what could be expected during the season, because the system had occurred further east than normal. In mid December the Cook Islands Meteorological Service director commented to the media that from now on, by the time cyclones reached Raro-Tonga would have lost their intensity, while a spokesperson for NIWA commented that holidaymakers heading for the Pacific had a little chance of running into a cyclone as the damaging core of the cyclone was expected to be over the ocean while some cyclones were expected to be relatively weak. It was also noted that collectively the Pacific Islands Meteorological Services were bracing for up to 15 tropical cyclones during the season, compared to 12 during an average season.

Seasonal summary 

The 1997–98 season was one of the most active and longest South Pacific tropical cyclone seasons on record, with 16 tropical cyclones occurring within the South Pacific basin between 160°E and 120°W. The season was characterised by a very strong El Niño Event, which caused the South Pacific Convergence Zone, to move from its usual position near the Solomon Islands to the Northern Cook Islands. As a result, ten tropical cyclones formed to the east of the International Dateline, with seven of these tropical cyclones going on to affect French Polynesia.

After the 1996–97 season had one of the latest ends to a season on record, the 1997–98 season started early with three tropical systems observed before the start of the season on November 1, 1997. Two other tropical systems, including the precursor tropical disturbance to Severe Tropical Cyclone Martin developed, before the official start of the season on November 1, 1997. Severe Tropical Cyclone Martin impacted the Cook Islands and French Polynesia, where it caused significant damage and 28 deaths during the opening days of the season. Tropical Cyclone Nute was named on November 18, before it moved out of the basin as a Category 2 tropical cyclone during November 19. During the rest of November, several tropical disturbances developed along the South Pacific Convergence Zone, including the precursor system to Severe Tropical Cyclone Osea and Tropical Cyclone Pam. Osea was named

Severe Tropical Cyclones Ron and Susan were both the strongest tropical cyclones of the season and were thought to be the strongest tropical cyclones in the region since Severe Tropical Cyclone Hina of the 1984–85 season.

After the final warnings on Cyclone Tui were issued a weak circulation remained in the vicinity of Samoa for several days, before a westerly surge from the monsoon resulted in a tropical cyclone developing during February 1. However, due to uncertainties in the continuation of Tui after several other weak low-pressure areas had formed, the FMS decided to treat the cyclone as a separate system and named it Wes.

Tropical Cyclone Bart developed during the final days of the season and caused ten deaths and minor damage to French Polynesia, before it dissipated during May 3. The names Katrina, Martin, Nute, Osea, Ron, Susan, Tui, Ursula and Veli, were subsequently retired from the lists of names for the region.

Systems

Tropical Cyclone Lusi 

Over the next few days the system moved southwards, towards the upper subtropical ridge while outflow gradually developed further. During October 8, the system was classified as a tropical depression as the system rapidly developed further, before the JTWC initiated advisories on the depression and designated it as Tropical Cyclone 02P. Over the next few days, Lusi moved towards the south-southeast, taking a so-called "gentleman's track" between Vanuatu and Fiji.

After it had peaked in intensity Lusi started to weaken in an area of cooler sea surface temperatures, while vertical wind shear increased because of a mid-level trough and strong north-westerlies. During October 12, Lusi degenerated into an extratropical cyclone, before the remnants were last noted to the northeast of New Zealand. There was no impact caused by Lusi on any island, however, widespread heavy rainfall and gale-force winds were reported on several Fijian Islands.

Severe Tropical Cyclone Martin 

On October 27, the FMS started to monitor a weak tropical disturbance that had developed to the north of the Northern Cook Islands. Over the next few days atmospheric convection surrounding the system remained disorganised, as the system moved to the southwest and was affected by strong upper-level north-easterly winds and moderate to strong vertical wind shear. Late on October 30, the NPMOC designated the disturbance as Tropical Cyclone 04P, after it had developed into a tropical depression. During the next day the system started to show a marked improvement in organisation and began rapidly developing, before the FMS named it Martin at 1500 UTC after it had developed into a category 1 tropical cyclone. Early on November 1, the FMS reported that the system had become a category 2 tropical cyclone on the Australian scale, before the NPMOC reported that Martin had become equivalent to a category 1 hurricane on the SSHWS.

During November 2, the system continued to intensify as it moved towards the southeast and became equivalent to a category 2 hurricane on the SSHWS, as it moved towards the French Polynesian Society Islands of Bellingshausen, Mopelia and Scilly. After peaking in intensity Martin started to weaken, as it interacted with a frontal system and started to accelerate towards the south-southeast. During November 4, Martin passed within  of Tahiti as it became a category 2 tropical cyclone and started to transition into an extratropical cyclone. During November 5, the system weakened below tropical cyclone intensity as it moved into Met Services's area of responsibility, before it was last noted on November 8.

Tropical Cyclone Nute 

Over the next few days the system moved towards the west, before it came under the influence of the subtropical ridge of high pressure.

The JTWC initiated advisories on the depression at 0600 UTC and designated it as 05P, before six hours later, the FMS named the depression Nute, as it had intensified into a Category 1 tropical cyclone. As Nute traversed an island-free area of the western South Pacific, there were no deaths or impact reported.

Severe Tropical Cyclone Osea 

Over the next two days, the depression gradually developed further. At 1200 UTC on November 23, the NPMOC reported that the depression had become equivalent to a tropical storm and assigned it the designation 06P, before 12 hours later the FMS named the system Osea, as it had developed into a category 1 tropical cyclone. After developing into a tropical cyclone, Osea started moving towards the southeast. After it had peaked, Osea started to gradually weaken, before during November 27 the NPMOC issued their final warning on the system as it had become sheared. The FMS monitored Osea for another 24 hours, before the system degenerated into a depression during November 28.

While it was active, Osea caused no deaths but was quite destructive to some of the northwestern Society Islands, with over 700 homes destroyed or severely damaged on Maupiti, Bora-Bora, and Raiatea. On Maupiti, an island with a population of 1100, about 95% of the infrastructure was destroyed. The town hall, two schools, and an airfield were destroyed. The town hall was evacuated due to the strong winds. In addition, 77 homes on the island were destroyed. Due to flooding, many highways were blocked. On Bora-Bora, an island which had a population of 4,500 at the time, roughly 30% of the infrastructure was destroyed, including 309 houses. On the north side of Bora Bora, nearly everything was destroyed, including the village of Vaitape. In Vaitape, roads were blocked and telecommunication lines were hampered. Seven people on the island were injured. Overall, 700 homes were at least somewhat destroyed by Osea. Throughout French Polynesia, banana trees were knocked down due to the strong winds.

Tropical Cyclone Pam 

This wind burst led to the development of two tropical cyclones, to the east of the International Dateline on either side of the equator. During December 5, both the FMS and the NPMOC started to monitor the system as a tropical depression, while it was located between the Samoan and Northern Cook Islands. During that day the system slowly developed and organized further and moved south-eastwards, before early on December 6, the FMS reported that the system had developed into a category 1 tropical cyclone and named it Pam. After it was named the system continued to slowly drift towards the south-southeast, before it started to move quicker later that day as it passed near the Cook Island of Suwarrow.

During December 9, Pam started to rapidly weaken as it transitioned into an extra-tropical cyclone, while the FMS reported during the next day that the system had degenerated into depression. Over the next few days the system continued to move southeastwards, before it was last noted during December 14, while located to the west of Chile.

Severe Tropical Cyclone Susan 

Over the next two weeks the system gradually moved towards the west-southwest, without developing into a tropical cyclone. During January 3, the JTWC initiated warnings on the system and designated it as Tropical Cyclone 11P. Later that day the FMS named the system Susan as the system had become a category 1 tropical cyclone, while it was located near the Fiji dependency of Rotuma. Later that day the JTWC reported that Susan had become equivalent to a category 1 hurricane on the Saffir-Simpson Hurricane Scale, as atmospheric convection surrounding the system organized further and developed an eye feature.

Susan subsequently moved towards the southwest as the subtropical ridge of high pressure weakened. As the system reached its peak intensity, Susan was moving towards the southwest and as a result, it "posed a severe threat to Vanuatu," however during that afternoon, Susan recurved towards the southeast "just in time to spare Vanuatu, a direct hit." After turning away from Vanuatu, Susan accelerated towards the southeast while remaining near or at its peak intensities, before starting to weaken significantly during January 7. Later that day, Susan started to interact with Ron before by 0000 UTC on January 9, Susan had completely absorbed Ron. The final advisories on the combined system, were then released later that day as the system lost its tropical characteristics and started to undergo an extratropical transition. The remnants of the combined systems were then monitored for another day until they were last noted at 1200 UTC on January 10, bringing an unseasonable cold snap to New Zealand.

Total damage from Susan was minor. High seas in accordance with Susan inundated the village of Talaulia on Kadavu, Fiji. There was also some destroyed waterfront buildings, roads, jetties and bridges on Kadavu. In Beqa Island, only high seas and swells were experienced. In the town of Lautoka, on Viti Levu, roofs were blown off shops. This damage was possibly caused by a tornado that formed from one of the outer rain bands. One death was reported in accordance with Susan. This death was on Ambrym Island in Vanuatu, where a woman was killed by a falling coconut palm tree.

Severe Tropical Cyclone Ron

Severe Tropical Cyclone Katrina 

The system subsequently moved south-eastwards and intensified further, before it became a Category 3 Severe Tropical Cyclone and posed a threat to Vanuatu during the next day. It caused one death in Vanuatu, when a man drowned after being swept away by large swells and rough seas while fishing. The system then meandered within the Coral Sea between the Queensland coast and Vanuatu for the next three weeks, before degenerating into a remnant low near Far North Queensland on 25 January. After its decay, the remnants of Katrina moved westward over Cape York Peninsula and the Gulf of Carpentaria, before regenerating into Cyclone Victor on February 8, after which the system moved through the Northern Territory and into the Indian Ocean, over the course of the next week. Upon reaching the Indian Ocean on 16 February, the system was named "Cindy" by Mauritius, before eventually dissipating on 19 February.

Cyclone Katrina impacted parts of Queensland, Vanuatu, and the Solomon Islands, killing two people and causing $8.66 million (1998 USD) in damages.

Tropical Cyclone Tui 

After it had crossed Samoa, the system remained near stationary, just to the south of Samoa, before early on January 27 both the NPMOC and the FMS, reported that Tui had weakened into a depression and issued their final advisories. After Tui was downgraded to a depression, a weak circulation remained in the vicinity of the Samoan islands for several days, before it possibly redeveloped into Tropical Cyclone Wes. Ahead of Tui affecting the Samoan islands, Polynesian Airlines and Samoa Air cancelled all of their flights to the islands. Large crop losses and some infrastructure damage were reported in American Samoa and Western Samoa after gale-force wind gusts, heavy rain and rough seas brought down power lines, trees and other debris. On the Western Samoan island of Savai'i, a young boy was killed when he stepped into an electrified puddle of water.

Tropical Cyclone Ursula 

Just after Tropical Cyclone Tui had weakened into a depression near the Samoan Islands, a new tropical depression developed to the northeast of Tahiti in French Polynesia during January 29. Over the next day the system subsequently moved south-eastwards and gradually developed further, before it was declared to be a Category 1 tropical cyclone and named Ursula by the FMS. Ursula subsequently gradually intensified and accelerated towards the south-east, as it got caught up in a westerly flow and passed through French Polynesia's Tuamotu Islands. In association with Tropical Cyclone Veli, Ursula brought significant waves which caused minor damages to three Tuamotuan islands of Mataiva, Rangiroa, Makatea. Mataiva was the worst hit island with 39 homes damaged, while roads and bridges were washed away. On Makatea island five houses were damaged while operations at Rangiroa's airstrip were disrupted, after coral and sand washed up onshore.

Tropical Cyclone Veli 

Over the next couple of days the system moved eastwards while gradually developing further, with the NPMOC issuing a tropical cyclone formation alert on the system early on February 1. Later that day the FMS named the system Veli as it had intensified into a category 1 tropical cyclone, while it came under the influence of a mid level trough of low pressure and started to move towards the southeast. Later that day the NPMOC started to issue warnings on the system and designated it as Tropical Cyclone 18P, after it had continued to organize and convection surrounding the system had increased. Over the next day, the cyclone moved through the Tuamotu group of islands, as it began to experience significant vertical windshear and weakened into a depression. In association with Tropical Cyclone Ursula, Veli brought significant waves to French Polynesia's Tuamotu province and caused minor damages on the islands of Mataiva, Rangiroa, Makatea. Mataiva was the worst hit island with roads and bridges washed away, and 39 homes damaged. On Makatea island five houses were damaged while operations at Rangiroa's airstrip were disrupted after coral and sand washed up onshore.

Tropical Cyclone Wes 

During that day the depression moved slowly eastwards and intensified further, before it was named Wes by the FMS, after it had developed into a Category 1 tropical cyclone during February 1. Later that day the system subsequently started to rapidly weaken as it moved into an area of higher vertical wind shear and interacted with the westerlies. The system did not directly affect any inhabited islands, while there was no damage reported on Suwarrow from the system. However, 10 people were killed on the French Polynesian island of Tahaa, after two days of heavy rain associated with Wes caused a landslide during February 6.

Severe Tropical Cyclone Yali 

The system that was to become Yali was first noted as a tropical disturbance, to the northeast of Vanuatu during March 17. Over the next day the system moved towards the west-southwest between Vanuatu and the Solomon Islands under the influence of the subtropical ridge of high pressure to the south of the system. The FMS subsequently reported late on March 19, that the system had developed into a category 1 tropical cyclone and named it Yali. After it was named Yali re-curved and started moving towards the south-southeast, as the monsoonal flow to the north of the system strengthened.

Severe Tropical Cyclone Zuman 

During March 29, the JTWC issued a Tropical Cyclone Formation Alert, on a tropical disturbance that they had been monitoring for around a day to the northwest of Fiji. At this stage, atmospheric convection had started to persist over the systems low level circulation center, while an upper-level anticyclone had developed over the disturbance. During that day, the system was steered westwards towards Vanuatu, within an area of warm sea surface temperatures and weakening vertical windshear, by an upper-level ridge of high pressure located to the south of the system. The Fiji Meteorological Service subsequently classified the disturbance as a tropical depression, while the JTWC designated it as Tropical Cyclone 31P during March 30. The system subsequently continued to develop during the next day and was named Zuman by the FMS after it had developed into a Category 1 tropical cyclone on the Australian tropical cyclone intensity scale.

Tropical Cyclone Alan 

On April 17, the FMS started to monitor a tropical disturbance, that had developed to the east of the Northern Cook Islands. Over the next few days the system moved erratically, before it developed into a Category 1 tropical cyclone and was named Alan by the FMS during April 21. As a result, the FMS reported that Alan had weakened into a depression, while the NPMOC issued their final advisory on the system. Over the next day as a mid level trough of low pressure that had been shearing the system moved faster than expected the depression became better organized.

As a result, the NPMOC initiated advisories on the system again during April 24, while the FMS reported that Alan had re-intensified into a category 1 tropical cyclone later that day. Early on April 25, Alan passed near too or over the French Polynesian Society Islands of Maupiti, Bora-Bora, and Raiatea. During April 25, strong wind shear pulled the system apart, with visible imagery showing that the system had a fully exposed low level circulation. The NPMOC subsequently reissued their final advisory early the next day, as the system drifted towards the south-southeast while located to the west of Tahiti. The system affected French Polynesia with high winds and torrential rain, which caused several landslides within the Society Islands. The landslides caused two bridges to collapse and along with fallen trees blocked roads. Overall ten people died as a result of the system while thirty others were injured, with the majority of the casualties occurring due to landslides. On the islands of Ra'iātea, Tahaa and Huahine several churches, schools and clinics were damaged while water and electricity supplies were cut off. Within the islands around 750 houses were destroyed with 430 and 150 of these occurring on Huahine and Ra'iātea respectively.

Tropical Cyclone Bart 

During April 27, a tropical disturbance developed within the South Pacific Convergence Zone, near the French Polynesian atolls of Takaroa, Hao and Puka-Puka. The system subsequently moved eastwards over the next couple of days and gradually developed further with automatic weather stations reporting strong winds and significant pressure drops. The depression was subsequently named Bart by the FMS during April 29, after it had developed into a category 1 tropical cyclone on the Australian scale near the island of Hao.

However, by this time Bart had started to weaken, before on May 1, satellite imagery showed that the systems, low level centre had become exposed as the main area of convection had become sheared. Despite gale-force wind speeds occurring in Bart's southern semicircle, the system weakened into a tropical depression during May 1, before it dissipated to the north of Pitcairn Island on May 3. Ten deaths were associated with Bart after waves from the system capsized a boat, while any damage within French Polynesia if any was minimal.

Other systems 
Over the next couple of days the system moved towards the southwest before early on October 26, as convection surrounding the system organized further, the FMS reported that the system had developed into a tropical depression, while the JTWC issued a tropical cyclone formation alert on it. Over the next couple of days, a trough of low pressure approached the system and caused the depression to move south-eastwards, before the system dissipated to the north west of Fiji during October 28. Over the next few days the depression remained in the same general area before the final advisory was issued on February 15. On February 28, the FMS reported that two tropical depressions had developed within the basin.

Season effects 
This table lists all the storms that developed in the South Pacific basin during the 1997–98 season. It includes their intensity on the Australian Tropical cyclone intensity scale, duration, name, areas affected, deaths, and damages. The data for this table is mainly taken from the Fiji Meteorological Service, however, the data for 03P has been taken from the JTWC.

See also 

 Atlantic hurricane seasons: 1997, 1998
 Pacific hurricane seasons: 1997, 1998
 Pacific typhoon seasons: 1997, 1998
 North Indian Ocean cyclone seasons: 1997, 1998
 1997–98 South-West Indian Ocean cyclone season
 1997–98 Australian region cyclone season
 1982–83 South Pacific cyclone season

References

External links 

 
South Pacific cyclone seasons
Articles which contain graphical timelines